The Bojayá River is a river of Colombia. It drains into the Caribbean Sea via the Atrato River.

See also
List of rivers of Colombia

References
Rand McNally, The New International Atlas, 1993.

Rivers of Colombia